Kavita Dilip Patil (Born: 27 October 1988 at Kaij, Maharashtra) is a Maharashtrian cricketer. She is a right-handed batsman and bowls right-arm medium pace. She played for Maharashtra, Railways, West Zone and Central Zone. She made her debut in major domestic cricket on 3 November 2009 in a one-day match against Saurashtra. She has played 4 First-class, 57 List A and 49 Women's Twenty20 cricket matches.

References 

1988 births
People from Solapur district
Maharashtra women cricketers
Railways women cricketers
Central Zone women cricketers
West Zone women cricketers
Living people